Bouzincourt is a commune in the Somme department in Hauts-de-France in northern France.

The name Bouzincourt is derived from the words for forest (bosquet) and the typical Picardy village suffix '-court' . It was therefore a wooded village.

Geography

Places of interest
The church of St. Honore was destroyed during World War I but reconstructed in 1920 in the shape of a bullet. The tower is 36m high.
The stained-glass windows were restored by l'École de Nancy, and are worthy of attention.
The ‘muches’, man-made tunnels where the population hid during times of war.

Population

See also
Communes of the Somme department

References

External links

 Bouzincourt, Communauté de communes du Pays du Coquelicot 

Communes of Somme (department)